Chang Yu-lung is a Taiwanese pool player, and winner of the 2015 World Cup of Pool alongside Ko Pin-yi. Yu-Lung won the 2015 Steinway Classic defeating Ko Ping-chung in the final.

Titles 
 2015 World Cup of Pool - with (Ko Pin-yi)
 2014 China Open 9-Ball Championship 
 2015 Steinway Classic 10-Ball
 2010 China Open 9-Ball Championship

References

External links 
 Chang Yu-Lung at AZBilliards.com

Year of birth missing (living people)
Taiwanese pool players
Place of birth missing (living people)
Living people